Pristella is a genus of fish in the family Characidae. It was formerly a monotypic taxon only containing Pristella maxillaris, but in 2019 a second species, Pristella ariporo, was described.

Taxonomy 
Until 2019, Pristella was a monotypic genus, but P. ariporo was described in 2019. Additionally, Hyphessobrycon axelrodi may belong in Pristella due to its conical teeth, but further genetic studies are needed to confirm this.

Species 
There are currently 3 described species:

 Pristella ariporo 
 Pristella crinogi 
 Pristella maxillaris

References 

Characidae
Ray-finned fish genera
Taxa named by Carl H. Eigenmann